Adventures of Captain Fabian or Adventure in New Orleans is a 1951 American adventure film directed by William Marshall and starring Errol Flynn, Micheline Presle, Vincent Price, Agnes Moorehead and Victor Francen.

Plot

George Brissac owns a large country mansion in old New Orleans in 1860. He is engaged but is having an affair with a French Creole girl Lea, a maid in his household who has a gypsy aunt, Jezebel. George stands to inherit the estate from his childless uncle as long he keeps out of trouble. One day when he is out the maid throws a huge party in his house and everyone gets drunk. One male admirer is rebuffed. When George returns he kisses her and angers her admirer. A fight ensues and George is briefly knocked out. The admirer tries to kiss the girl and she hits him repeatedly on the head with George's cane and kills him. George decides to fabricate a story to keep out of any blame, and lies when the girl goes on trial for murder.

Meanwhile Captain Fabian returns to port. Although having no link to the events he goes to the trial having been told enough of the story to see a plot. He stops the trial and gets the judge to release the girl into his care. He buys a local bar. His overall aim seems to be to clear the name of his father who was a merchant who went bankrupt in the town.

Captain Fabian appears to also like Lea but is restrained in his actions.

However, Brissac also kills his own uncle when the uncle finds him kissing the maid. Despite his poor treatment of her she demands he marry her to keep her silence. When George's fiancee arrives with her family she is informed of the new arrangement. She says she will wait until he comes to his senses.

After marriage to Lea George cools in his desire and feels tricked into the marriage. New Orleans society is also shunning him. As they are the only witnesses to the uncle's murder they plan just to be wholly silent on the issue.

Ever the temptress Lea goes to Fabian's ship. He sees her for what she is but yields and kisses her in a strong embrace and says he loves her. When she asks him to take her away he reminds her she is now married...

George, sensing something wrong with Lea, reports his uncle's disappearance to the police, even though this will result in the finding of the uncle's grave on the estate at some point. However George has buried an inscribed pocket watch bearing Fabian's name with the body. When this is fond the police jump to the conclusion which George wants. He knows Lea cannot tell the truth without implicating herself. Lea and George each now want to kill the other.

The police arrest Fabian in his bar. But Fabian is very popular in the local community. Fabian knows that Brissac is the likely murderer and realizes why he married Lea. Lea holds the key to which one is hanged.

George hires a local crook to lynch Fabian and make it look like community justice. He gives the man the key to his warehouse of rum. Aunt Jezebel an Fabian's crew plan to save him. They release him and the two rival groups escape through the catacombs down to the docks where a huge brawl begins. The mob torch Fabian's ship as it tries to raise sail.

Fabian and Brissac end up fighting under the water. Fabian wins but his ship is destroyed. His cargo of gunpowder explodes and the main mast fall crushing Lea on the dockside. She says Fabian's name as she dies in his arms.

Cast
 Errol Flynn as Captain Fabian
 Micheline Presle as Lea Mariotte 
 Vincent Price as George Brissac
 Agnes Moorehead as Aunt Jezebel
 Victor Francen as Henri Brissac, George's uncle
 Jim Gérald as Police Commissioner Germain
 Héléna Manson as Josephine
 Howard Vernon as Emile
 Roger Blin as Philippe

Production
As with many later Flynn features, the tangled production history is arguably more interesting:  Marshall, the co-producer and husband of Micheline Presle, began shooting in France with no experience as a director and without realizing that French law required a parallel French-language version.  Robert Florey, who had directed Flynn in his last bit part in 1935, was hired as an uncredited "consultant".  The same year Marshall and Flynn also produced the unreleased Hello God.

The film was originally known as The Bargain and was based on a script by Errol Flynn himself. Flynn entered into a multi-picture deal with William Marshall to produce the film, among others, in July 1949. It was to be produced independently with a distributor sought later. Micheline Presle was borrowed from 20th Century Fox to play the female lead. Gérard Philipe was to be in the cast but did not appear in the end. (Presle and Marshall later married.)

At one stage the film was also known as Bloodline and New Orleans Adventure. Filming started on July 15, 1950 in Paris under the title of The Bargain. Exteriors representing New Orleans were recreated in the city of Villefranche with studio scenes shot at the Victorine Studios in Nice and the Billancourt Studios in Paris.

The film was meant to be shot in French and English versions but Marshall persuaded the French government to allow it to be made in English only. Robert Florey started the English production but not long after shooting began Marshall took over.

Under Errol Flynn's contract with Warner Bros, he was allowed to make one "outside" film a year until 1962, provided it had a major distributor. Flynn later claimed that during filming, William Marshall "secretly" committed the film to being released by Republic Pictures, one of the smaller studios. Both Warner Bros and MGM, who had films starring Flynn awaiting release, were unhappy with this. Flynn worried that Warner Bros would use this as an excuse to cancel their contract with him on the basis that Republic was not a major. On 18 December 1950 he filed suit in the Los Angeles Superior Court asking them to stop Republic from releasing the film and to stop Warner Bros from cancelling the contract until the court could determine that Republic was a "major" distributor.

Release

Box Office
The film was reasonably successful  at the box office in France.

Critical reception
The Los Angeles Times said that the film "is much in need of both editing and shortening. It will draw approval for the colourfulness of its settings and interesting costuming. The audience seemed to enjoy it though there was a tendency towards laughter for scenes not especially designed for comedy... One cannot conclude that this picture in its present shape hangs together satisfactorily."

Filmink magazine wrote that " It's not a terribly accomplished screenplay – it constantly changes protagonists, not in an interesting way... and is confusing – but at least it has ambition" adding that "the quality of the cast is high" and "there's always something happening on screen, the production values are decent (costumes, sets), and its ambition is endearing. "

Proposed sequels
The movie was meant to be the first of two films from Flynn and Marshall, the second which was to be The Man Who Cried, a psychological thriller about the perfect crime set over a four-hour period, but this wasn't made due to a dispute between Marshall and Flynn over Hello God.

Lawsuits
In November 1951, Charles Gross, an associate of Flynn's, sued claiming payments due for working on the screenplay.

In January 1952, Flynn asked a court to formally end the partnership with Marshall.

In 1954, Vincent Price sued Flynn and Marshall for $15,000 in unpaid wages, claiming he had been promised a fee of $35,000. A court awarded in his favour in 1957.

References

External links 
 
 Turner Classic Movies page
Review of film at Variety

1951 films
American romantic drama films
1950s English-language films
Films directed by Robert Florey
Films set in New Orleans
Films set in the 1860s
Films shot in France
French black-and-white films
French historical films
French romantic drama films
American independent films
Republic Pictures films
Southern Gothic films
American historical films
1950s historical films
English-language French films
1950s independent films
1951 romantic drama films
American black-and-white films
Films shot at Billancourt Studios
Films shot at Victorine Studios
1950s American films
Films based on American novels
1950s French films